A. H. M. Hamidur Rahman Azad is a Bangladesh Jamaat-e-Islami politician and the former Member of Parliament from Cox's Bazar-2.

Career
Azad is the secretary of the Dhaka city unit of Bangladesh Jamaat-e-Islami. Azad was elected to Parliament in 2008 from Cox's Bazar-2 as a Bangladesh Jamaat-e-Islami candidate. He served in the Parliamentary Standing Committee on Ministry of Water Resources.

References

Bangladesh Jamaat-e-Islami politicians
Living people
9th Jatiya Sangsad members
1965 births